The Real World: Paris is the thirteenth season of MTV's reality television series The Real World, which focuses on a group of diverse strangers living together for several months in a different city each season, as cameras follow their lives and interpersonal relationships. It is the only season to be filmed in France.

The season featured seven people living in a four-story château and is the second of four seasons of The Real World to be filmed entirely outside of the United States after The Real World: London in 1995, and before The Real World: Sydney in 2007, and The Real World: Cancun in 2009.

The season was filmed over 120 days from January 19 to May 18, 2003. The season premiered on June 3 of that year and consisted of 25 episodes.

Assignment
Almost every season of The Real World, beginning with its fifth season, has included the assignment of a season-long group job or task to the housemates, continued participation in which has been mandatory to remain part of the cast since the tenth season. The Paris cast was assigned to write reviews for Frommer's, reviewing various Paris bars, clubs and other attractions. A weekly bonus would be given to the housemates if they all completed their weekly assignments, which they rarely did. In fact, two of the castmates, Chris "C.T." Tamburello and Leah Gillingwater, were caught submitting fake reviews.

The residence
The four-story  Château was built in 1869, and is located in Le Vésinet, a commune of France in the western suburbs of Paris, France. Le Vésinet is one of the wealthiest suburbs of Paris, known for its wooded avenues and bourgeois mansions built around boating lakes and English-Style gardens. In some of the rooms of the Château, fake walls were built to protect 18 carat gilding on the original surfaces. The Château includes a wine cellar.

Cast

: Age at the time of filming.

Episodes

After filming
Six months after the cast left the Real World house, six of them, except for Simon, who was there via telephone, appeared to discuss their experiences both during and since their time on the show, French Kissing and Telling: The Real World Paris Reunion which premiered on November 11, 2003, and was hosted by La La Vazquez.

At the 2008 The Real World Awards Bash, Mallory was nominated in the "Hottest Female" category, CT in the "Hottest Male" one, and Adam for "Best Dance-Off".

Mallory Snyder later became a Sports Illustrated swimsuit model. She posed for the 2005 and 2006 Sports Illustrated Swimsuit Editions, and has also modeled for Abercrombie & Fitch and J. Crew.

Chris Tamburello's first child, Christopher Junior, was born in 2016 and also appeared in an episode of Invasion of the Champions. In 2018, Tamburello married Lilianet Solares and their wedding aired on MTV as a two-week special. That same year, he appeared on Fear Factor alongside Cara Maria Sorbello from Fresh Meat II. He also starred in the movie Habitual directed by Johnny Hickey, which was released on November 13, 2020 and also featured Emilee Fitzpatrick from The Real World: Cancun and Sabrina Kennedy from Real World: Go Big or Go Home. In 2022, Tamburello filed for divorce from Solares.

Leah Gillingwater has a son named Griffin.<ref name="generation">{{cite web|title='Real Worlds Next Generation: See The Former Cast Members' Camera-Ready Kids|url=http://www.mtv.com/news/2065104/real-world-castmembers-kids/|author=Jordana Ossad|website=MTV|date=February 2, 2015|access-date=May 13, 2019}}</ref>

Simon Sherry-Wood appeared as a member of the Scruff Pit Crew during season 6 of RuPaul's Drag Race.

The Challenge

Challenges in bold indicate that the contestant was a finalist on the Challenge.

Note: CT made an appearance on Cutthroat for an elimination, and Battle of the Bloodlines'' for a challenge and an elimination.

References

External links
MTV's The Real World: Paris Official Site
"The Real World: Paris: Meet the Cast". MTV.com
The Real World: Paris Chateau
The Real World and Road Rules Blog

Paris
Television shows set in Paris
2003 American television seasons
Works about Paris
2003 in France
Television shows filmed in France